Shahril Ishak (born 23 January 1984) is a Singaporean former football player who last played as a striker, winger or central-midfielder. He is regarded as one of Singapore’s greatest footballers of all time. A former captain of the Singapore national football team and winner of the AFF Suzuki Cup MVP, Shahril led Singapore to become the first nation to win four titles in the tournament's history. He followed it up by winning the inaugural AFF Player of the Year (Men) award in 2013.

Club career

Along with Baihakki Khaizan, Hassan Sunny and Khairul Amri, Shahril was in the pioneer batch of the National Football Academy in 2000.

Young Lions
Shahril had previously played for S.League clubs Young Lions and Home United. He joined the Young Lions in 2003 and soon made his international debut. After four seasons, Shahril Ishak left the Young Lions in 2007 to join Home United.

Home United
Shahril made his Home United debut in at the start of the 2007 season. He played his final game for Home United on 21 Sep 2010, scoring two crucial goals against title rivals Tampines Rovers FC. He then left for Indonesia with five games remaining in the S.League season. He finished his last season in Home United with 17 goals to his name and was the third highest scorer during the 2010 S.League season. He also won the 2010 S.League Player of the Year award.

Persib Bandung
In 2010, Shahril signed a 1-year contract with Indonesian side Persib Bandung, along with his fellow Singapore national football team player, Baihakki Khaizan.

Medan Chiefs
In February 2011, Shahril signed a one-year deal worth $400,000 with Liga Primer Indonesia side, Medan Chiefs. He then went on to score 8 league goals in 32 matches for Medan Chiefs.

LionsXII
Shahril returned to Singapore with newly formed club side LionsXII in December 2011. During his stint at LionsXII, he won the 2013 Malaysia Super League title in his second season as well as scoring 17 goals in 34 appearances, finishing as the club top scorer in the 2013 season.

Johor Darul Ta'zim II
Shahril signed a 4-year contract at the end of the 2013 Malaysia Super League by joining Malaysia Premier League club, Johor Darul Takzim II F.C. He was given the number 17 shirt upon his arrival to the club. He was appointed as the captain for his new club in the 2014 Malaysia Premier League. He was converted back to a centre midfielder/play-maker role and led his new club to a 5th placing position, finishing the season with 7 goals and 8 assists for his new team. He led Johor Darul Takzim II F.C. for the 2015 Malaysia Premier League as the captain again, and led his club to a 5th placing position again, finishing the season with 5 goals and 6 assists.

In total, Shahril scored 23 goals in 75 appearances for JDT II between 2014 and 2016.

Warriors
Sharil returned to Singapore to play in the S.League with Warriors FC for the 2017 S.League campaign together with Baihakki Khaizan. He scored his first goal for the club in a 4–3 win over the Garena Young Lions and notched his first brace for the club in a 2–2 draw with Home United FC, scoring both goals in the final 9 minutes of the match, extending the Warriors' unbeaten run at the start of the season to 6 games. He scored a further two goals in the Warriors' tenth league game of the season, sealing a 2–0 win over Geylang International to end a wretched two months spell for his club, where they only won once and was dumped out of the Singapore Cup. Shahril had a great season despite his advancing years, scoring 1/3 of his team's goals (11) and playing in all 24 league games, starting 23 of them.

Return to Home United
Sharil returned to Home United for the 2018 S.League season, coming into replace last season's top-scorer Stipe Plazibat who had left for Thailand as well as Khairul Nizam who had moved in the other direction to Warriors FC.

Hougang United 
Sharil joined Hougang United in January 2021.

International career

Senior
Singapore's most natural creative midfielder to emerge in recent years, Shahril Ishak quickly established himself as the heartbeat of the Lions engine room since he made his international debut aged just 19 against Maldives on 4 March 2003.

With winger Muhammad Ridhuan, defender Baihakki Khaizan and keeper Hassan Sunny, he was part of the "NFA Gang of Four", the quartet which had played together since their early teenage years and earned senior international honours in 2003.

He has been employed in various positions across the midfield by coach Radojko Avramovic, but Shahril staked a strong claim for an influential central role with a series of convincing performances there in the second half of 2004.

He played a major role in the victory in the Tiger Cup in 2005 and also the ASEAN Football Championship in 2007. He was also part of the 2005 SEA Games squad and the 2006 Asian Games.

He was part of the Singapore Under-23 team that took part in the 2007 Southeast Asian Games in Korat, Thailand that won a bronze medal.

Capped for Singapore at senior, U23, U18 and U16 levels.

In August 2010 Shahril was revealed as the new captain of the national team, and led the Lions for the AFF Suzuki Cup in December.

On 24 February 2011, Shahrill Ishak converted a penalty into a goal in a 2–2 draw against Azerbaijan national football team.

Shahril is an inductee of the FIFA Century Club.

As captain, he was instrumental in Singapore's 2012 AFF Championship win, scoring 4 goals in 7 appearances to help the Lions win their 4th title.

Singapore selection
Shahril was selected as part of the Singapore Selection squad for The Sultan of Selangor's Cup to be held on 6 May 2017.

Personal life 
Away from the pitch, Shahril is also the founder of inlovebytns, a clothing brand jointly managed with his wife, Nur Hidayah, that was started in late 2014. The business began in 2013 as a streetwear label called The Number Seventeen – a reference to Shahril's jersey number and TNS for short. All TNS apparel are designed by Shahril.

Career statistics

Club
. Caps and goals may not be correct.

 Young Lions and LionsXII are ineligible for qualification to AFC competitions in their respective leagues.

International

International goals

Honours

Club
LionsXII
Malaysia Super League: 2013

International
Singapore
ASEAN Football Championship: 2004, 2007, 2012
Southeast Asian Games bronze medal: 2007

Individual
S.League Player of the Year: 2010
Tiger Beer Goal of the Year: 2010 (40', Home United vs SAFFC on 16 July)
AFF Suzuki Cup MVP: 2012
AFF Player of the Year (Men): 2013
 ASEAN Football Federation Best XI: 2013

See also 
 List of men's footballers with 100 or more international caps

References

Notes

International caps milestones
115th – Syria, 15 November 2013 
117th – Oman, 5 March 2014

External links

1984 births
Living people
Singaporean footballers
Singapore international footballers
Expatriate footballers in Indonesia
Singaporean expatriate footballers
Singaporean expatriate sportspeople in Indonesia
Persib Bandung players
Liga 1 (Indonesia) players
Indonesian Premier Division players
Home United FC players
Singapore Premier League players
Expatriate footballers in Malaysia
Singaporean expatriate sportspeople in Malaysia
Johor Darul Ta'zim F.C. players
Malaysia Super League players
Association football forwards
FIFA Century Club
LionsXII players
Singaporean people of Malay descent
Association football wingers
Young Lions FC players
Footballers at the 2006 Asian Games
Footballers at the 2010 Asian Games
Southeast Asian Games bronze medalists for Singapore
Southeast Asian Games medalists in football
Competitors at the 2007 Southeast Asian Games
Asian Games competitors for Singapore
Lion City Sailors FC players